The Institute of Problems of Chemical Physics (IPCP) of the Russian Academy of Sciences (RAS) is the largest Institute of the research center in Chernogolovka. The Institute consists of 10 scientific departments and about 100 laboratories each one held by an independent research groups. The staff of the Institute counts nearly 1500 people, among them more than 100 Professors and 350 PhD.

History 
IPCP was established in 1956 as branch of the Moscow Institute of Chemical Physics RAS. It was reorganized as an independent Institute of Chemical Physics of RAS in Chernogolovka (1991-1997) and as Institute of Problems of Chemical Physics (since 1997).

The Institute is the basis of a Branch of the Moscow State University, a chair of Moscow Institute of Physics and Technology and other high schools. Many students of different high schools of the former USSR and Russia were professionally trained in the IPCP RAS: more than a thousand PhD and SciD thesises were defended here. Specialists trained at the Institute work in the RAS organisations and collaborate with numerous foreign Universities and Institutes.

Research activity
IPCP carry out investigations in the following fields: general problems of chemical physics, structure of molecules and solids, kinetics and mechanisms of complex chemical reactions, chemical physics of explosion and combustion, chemical physics of polymer synthesis and modification, chemical physics of biological processes and systems, chemical materials science.

In IPCP RAS, a unique experimental base, a testing area and specialized premises allowing large-scale investigations of rapid processes, combustion and explosion, nature chemical-technological and micro-biological installations, vivarium and a modern computer center have been created.

See also

Mathematical chemistry
Aizik Isaakovich Vol'pert

Notes

References

. "The Institute of Chemical Physics. Historical essays" (English translation of the title) is an historical book on the Institute of Problems of Chemical Physics, written by Fedor Ivanovich Dubovitskii, one of his founders and leading directors for many years. It gives many useful details on the lives and the achievements of many scientists who worked there, including Aizik Isaakovich Vol'pert.
. "Institute of Problems of Chemical Physics. Fifty years in the trenches" (English translation of the title) is a brief historical sketch of the institute, published in the first volume of the 2004 yearbook.

External links
Official Website 

Research institutes in the Soviet Union
Institutes of the Russian Academy of Sciences
Chemical research institutes
Moscow Institute of Physics and Technology
Nuclear weapons program of the Soviet Union
Research institutes established in 1956